C More Tennis was a Scandinavian premium sports channel which replaced Canal+ Sport 2 on September 4, 2012, and became a sports channel with only tennis from ATP Tour, WTA Tour and Davis Cup. The channel also has the rights to the Grand Slam tournament Wimbledon.

The channel was available:

In Sweden through the C More packets: C More Max, C More Sports and C More Family.

In Norway, through the C More packets: C More Total and C More Sports.

In Finland through the package: MTV3 Total.

However, it was not meaningful in the first place that the channel should be available in Denmark since Canal 8 Sport substituted C More Sports and Tennis would be shown there, but the channel is available through C More Film package from Canal Digital, YouSee and Altibox together with C More Extreme. 
But in early 2013, it was recognized that there was not always room till all tennis tournaments on Canal 8 Sport so that the channel was in March 2013 made available through YouSee where the channel could be optional as an additional channel to 30, — DKR. Also, C More Extreme was made an additional channel to 30, - DKR

History
The channel got in early 2013 the rights to the WTA Tour, but only in Sweden, Norway and Finland, in Denmark, TV3 Sport 2 have the rights, So the WTA Tour transmissions will be blocked in Denmark together with The Grand Slam tournament Wimbledon, which also TV3 Sport 2 has the rights to.

Tennis Rights

 ATP Tour 
 WTA Tour (Blocked In Denmark)
 Davis Cup
 The Grand Slam tournament Wimbledon. (Blocked In Denmark)

Pan-Nordic television channels
Sports television networks
Defunct television channels in Sweden
Defunct television channels in Norway
Defunct television channels in Denmark
Defunct television channels in Finland
Television channels and stations established in 2006
Television channels and stations disestablished in 2017